John Francis Maurice Nash  was  Archdeacon of Tuam  from 1950 until 1956.

Nash was born on 5 December 1879, educated at  Trinity College, Dublin and ordained in 1904. After a curacies at Kilmoremoy and Knockainy he returned to Kilmoremoy as Rector. He was Rector of Galway from 1925 and Rural Dean of Tuam from 1944.

References

1879 births
Irish Anglicans
Archdeacons of Tuam
Alumni of Trinity College Dublin
Year of death missing